Peter Schaale (born 14 June 1996) is a German professional footballer.

Club career

Early career
Until 2009, Schaale played for the academy of local club SV Wittlich. That year, he joined the academy of Regionalliga side SV Eintracht Trier. In July 2012, Schaale switched to the academy of 2. Bundesliga side 1. FC Köln. In 2014–15, Schaale played for the academy of Regionalliga side FC Viktoria Köln and made 24 appearances in the Under 19 Bundesliga that season, scoring two goals. In 2015–16, he played his first season of senior football with German Landesliga Mittelrhein side SG Köln-Worringen.

In 2016, Schaale moved to Canada to attend Cape Breton University in Nova Scotia. In three seasons with the CBU Capers he made a total of 35 appearances and scored nine goals. On 8 November 2018, he was named Atlantic University Sport Men's Soccer MVP and was later named Cape Breton University Male Athlete of the Year.

Victoria Highlanders
In 2018, Schaale played for Premier Development League side Victoria Highlanders, making twelve appearances.

HFX Wanderers
On 14 November 2018, Schaale was selected in the first round of the CPL–U Sports Draft, fifth overall by HFX Wanderers. On 29 March 2019, Schaale officially signed with Halifax. He made his debut on 28 April 2019 as a starter in the Wanderers' inaugural match. On 30 May 2019, he scored his first professional goal in the 15th minute of a 1–1 draw against York9. Schaale made seventeen league appearances that season and another five in the Canadian Championship. In mid August 2019, Schaale left the club to complete his studies at Cape Breton University in the fall.

On 12 December 2019, Schaale re-signed with Halifax for the 2020 season. After the 2022 CPL season, Schaale's contract option was decliend by the Wanderers, ending his time with the club.

Personal life
Schaale was born in Wittlich, Rhineland-Palatinate and lived in Frankfurt for the first five years of his life when his father worked for Eintracht Frankfurt, after which his family moved back to Wittlich.

Honours
HFX Wanderers
 Canadian Premier League runner-up: 2020

Individual
 AUS Most Valuable Player: 2018, 2019
 Cape Breton University Male Athlete of the Year: 2018

References

External links

 

1996 births
Living people
Association football defenders
German footballers
Footballers from Frankfurt
People from Wittlich
German expatriate footballers
Expatriate soccer players in Canada
German expatriate sportspeople in Canada
SV Eintracht Trier 05 players
1. FC Köln players
FC Viktoria Köln players
Cape Breton Capers soccer players
Victoria Highlanders players
HFX Wanderers FC players
HFX Wanderers FC draft picks
Landesliga players
USL League Two players
Canadian Premier League players